Charley Roussel Fomen (born 9 July 1989) is a Cameroonian footballer who plays as a left-back.

Club career
Fomen began his professional career in 2007 with Mount Cameroon FC, moving in the following year to Panthère de Bangangté.

On 17 April 2009, he had his first abroad experience, signing with French club Olympique de Marseille, who had already scouted the player. During his first season, he did not appear in the league, as the club won the title.

On 1 July 2010, Fomen was loaned to second level's Dijon FCO, in a season-long move. He played 28 times as the club won promotion to Ligue 1.

On 3 August 2011, Fomen moved to Ligue 2 side Clermont Foot on free transfer. After four seasons with Clermont, Fomen was sidelined for a year through injury. He moved to Iceland and signed for Fimleikafélag Hafnarfjarðar. He was loaned by them to another Icelandic club, Leiknir Reykjavík. When his father died in January 2017 he returned to Cameroon, signing a contract with Feutcheu FC.

Fomen signed a two-year contract with French Championnat National side Red Star in July 2017.

International career
Fomen earned his first call-up for the U-17 of Cameroon on 27 July 2006, being summoned for a training camp in his hometown of Buea.

References

External links

OM profile 

1989 births
Living people
People from Buea
Association football defenders
Cameroonian footballers
Panthère du Ndé players
Olympique de Marseille players
Dijon FCO players
Clermont Foot players
Red Star F.C. players
Ligue 2 players
Ligue 1 players
Cameroonian expatriate footballers
Expatriate footballers in France
Cameroon under-20 international footballers